Albert Wallace Couppee (June 4, 1920 – July 3, 1998) was an American football running back in the National Football League (NFL) for the Washington Redskins.  He played college football at the University of Iowa and was drafted in the 22nd round of the 1942 NFL Draft.

References

1920 births
1998 deaths
American football running backs
Iowa Hawkeyes football players
Iowa Pre-Flight Seahawks football players
Washington Redskins players
Sportspeople from Council Bluffs, Iowa
Players of American football from Iowa